Miss International 2005, the 45th Miss International pageant, was held on September 26, 2005 at the Koseinenkin Hall in Tokyo, Japan. 52 contestants from all over the world competed for the crown. Jeymmy Vargas of Colombia crowned her successor Lara Quigaman of the Philippines as the new Miss International. She became the fourth Filipino to win the pageant.

Results

Placements

Contestants

  – Gita van Bochove
  – Natalie Gillard
  – Brianna Clarke
  – Gretel María Stehli Parada
  – Ariane Colombo
  – Micaela Smith
  – Yang Li
  – Diana Patricia Arbeláez González
  – Charis Dimitriou
  – Petra Machackova
  – Yadira Geara Cury
  – Bianca María Salame Avilés
  – Ana Saidia Palma Rebollo
  – Dina Fekadu Mosissa
  – Susanna Laine
  – Cynthia Tevere
  – Annika Pinter
  – Panagiota Perimeni
  – Ingrid Lopez
  – Queenie Chu
  – Vaishali Desai
  – Moran Gerbi
  – Naomi Ishizaka
  – Antontseva Segeevna
  – Lee Kyoung-eun
  – Zheng Ma
  – Winnie Chan Wai Ling
  – Gantogoo Bayaarkhuu
  – Nisha Adhikary
  – Lesley Delrieu
  – Ellie Bloomfield
  – Daniela Regina Clerk
  – Karoline Nakken
  – Lucía Matamoros
  – Liz Concepción Santacruz Amarilla
  – Vanessa López Vera Tudela
  – Precious Lara San Agustin Quigaman
  – Monika Szeroka
  – Dinorah Collazo
  – Sanja Miljanic
  – Catherine Tan
  – Lucia Debnarova
  – Maria del Pilar Domínquez
  – Cecilia Zatterlöf Harbo Kristensen
  – Li Yen Chin
  – Margareth Wilson Kiguha Chacha
  – Sukanya Pimmol
  – Şebnem Azade
  – Mariya Zhukova
  – Amy Guy
  – Anna Ward
  – Andrea Gómez

Notes

Debuts

Returns

Last competed in 1997:
 
Last competed in 1998:
 
Last competed in 2000:
 
 
 
Last competed in 2002:
 
 
Last competed in 2003:

Withdrawals

References

External links
 Pageantopolis – Miss International 2005

2005
2005 beauty pageants
2005 in Tokyo
Beauty pageants in Japan